Abdoulaye Djiré (born 28 February 1981),  also known as Junior, is an Ivorian former professional footballer who played as a midfielder.

Career
Djiré was born in Abidjan, Ivory Coast. He spent two years with the Ukrainian club FC Metalurh Donetsk before joining Belgian side K.F.C. Germinal Beerschot on loan for the second half of the 2007–08 season. Germinal Beerschot also secured an option to sign him permanently.

References

External links
 

1981 births
Living people
Ivorian footballers
Footballers from Abidjan
Association football midfielders
Ivory Coast international footballers
2002 African Cup of Nations players
ASEC Mimosas players
K.S.K. Beveren players
Beerschot A.C. players
FC Metalurh Donetsk players
FC Metalist Kharkiv players
Belgian Pro League players
Ukrainian Premier League players
Paris FC players
US Roye-Noyon players
Ivorian expatriate footballers
Ivorian expatriate sportspeople in Belgium
Expatriate footballers in Belgium
Ivorian expatriate sportspeople in Ukraine
Expatriate footballers in Ukraine
Ivorian expatriate sportspeople in France
Expatriate footballers in France